Alacan station is a defunct station of the Philippine National Railways Northrail in Brgy. Alacan, San Fabian, Pangasinan.

Information
This station is located near the sea side.

References

 

Philippine National Railways stations
Railway stations in Pangasinan